Beijing-Hong Kong Universities Alliance (BHUA) is an alliance of 20 prestigious universities located in China and Hong Kong. It was established in April 2018.

BHUA members includes world's renowned research universities such as Tsinghua University, Peking University, Renmin University of China, University of Chinese Academy of Sciences, University of Hong Kong and Hong Kong University of Science and Technology.

List of member institutions

Beijing
Tsinghua University
Peking University
Renmin University of China
University of Chinese Academy of Sciences
Beihang University
Beijing Foreign Studies University
Beijing Institute of Technology
Beijing Normal University
Beijing University of Technology 
Capital Medical University
Capital Normal University
Capital University of Economics and Business

Hong Kong
University of Hong Kong
Hong Kong University of Science and Technology
City University of Hong Kong
Hong Kong Baptist University
Lingnan University
Chinese University of Hong Kong
Education University of Hong Kong
Hong Kong Polytechnic University

References

External links 
 BHUA Official Website

Higher education in China
Higher education in Hong Kong
Professional associations based in China
Educational institutions established in 2018
College and university associations and consortia in Asia